Wincing the Night Away is the third studio album by the indie rock group The Shins. It was released by Sub Pop Records on January 23, 2007. It is the band's third album, and the last under their contract with Sub Pop. The album was recorded in James Mercer's basement studio, Phil Ek's home in Seattle and in Oregon City with the veteran producer Joe Chiccarelli. It was nominated for a Grammy Award for Best Alternative Music Album.

Writing and recording
Chiccareli had become acquainted with Mercer while in Portland, Oregon, working with Pink Martini. At the time Mercer was recording the new Shins album on his own and finding that it was not going the way he wanted and at the speed he wanted. Frustrated and in need of fresh objective feedback he sought Chiccarelli's advice and suggestions, before the producer eventually became involved in a professional capacity.

The duo did not start the record from scratch; while they started some songs completely anew, they also retained some of the material that Mercer had been recording on his own. According to Chiccarelli in an interview with HitQuarters, they spent around two months working together on the album.

Title
The title is a play on the title of a Sam Cooke song "Twistin' the Night Away". As reported in Rolling Stone magazine, it is a reference to band member James Mercer's "crippling insomnia". "Sleeping Lessons", the title of the first track, also refers to insomnia and was considered as a possible album title.

Before the album's release, Mercer announced Wincing the Night Away as the album title in an August 2006 interview with Billboard.

Prerelease
The full track listing was announced by Pitchfork Media on October 16, 2006. The first single, "Phantom Limb", was released on iTunes on November 14, 2006, and reached physical retailers on November 21. The new album was previewed in its entirety on the band's MySpace.

The album was leaked from a promotional copy on October 20, 2006. Sub Pop hired a UK company to track down the source of the leak.

On January 9, 2007, iTunes accidentally put the album on sale two weeks before its official release, then removed the option to purchase a day later. It is not known how many people purchased the album within these two days.

Sub Pop Records also released the album as a vinyl LP, which includes a free coupon to download the album in mp3 format.

Release
Wincing the Night Away debuted at number 2 on the Billboard 200 chart, selling in excess of 118,000 copies. This is the highest chart position reached by not only The Shins, but the whole Sub Pop label. During the same week, it also appeared as the top album in four other category charts: Top Digital Albums, Top Rock Albums, Tastemakers and Top Independent Albums.

In the album's second week on the Billboard 200, it fell to number eight and sold about 53,000 copies. Like Oh, Inverted World, the album went Gold. As of January 2012 Wincing the Night Away has sold 622,000 copies in United States.

Description
Mercer said that the band was "stretching out" on the new album, and that the extended recording period had given them more time to develop their ideas. He hoped to address more of the "human condition" on the third album, even though it is subdermally present in the previous two albums as well. Wincing the Night Away is The Shins' most musically diverse and experimental album yet, ranging from hip hop loops to psychedelic to Hawaiian folk to new wave and post-punk elements.

Reception

According to the review aggregator Metacritic, Wincing the Night Away is rated slightly lower on average than its predecessor, Chutes Too Narrow. While fewer in number, the positive reviews provided higher praise than for the band's prior work. For example, the Austin Chronicle said that it "makes both [previous] albums sound like fragmented potential".  The New Musical Express stated that the album was "their best yet". More negative reviews came from Dusted magazine, which said "this is music that not only is mature enough to know that it can't change the world, but is content to not try", while Village Voice said, "filler tunes like "Pam Berry" and "Black Wave" are a far cry from the tenacious stuff that made Chutes the subject of lavish hyperbole."

Track listing

The Japanese edition of the album contains two additional tracks, "Nothing at All" and "Spilt Needles" (alternate version), both taken from the "Phantom Limb" single. "Nothing at All" was also included on the album when pre-ordered on iTunes.

Personnel
James Mercer – vocals, guitar, bass guitar, synthesizers, ukulele, banjo, cat piano, percussion, beat and MIDI programming
Marty Crandall – synthesizers, organ, bass guitar, percussion
Dave Hernandez – lead guitar
Jesse Sandoval – drums
Chris Funk – lap steel guitar on "Red Rabbits" and "A Comet Appears", hammered dulcimer and bouzouki on "A Comet Appears"
Eric D. Johnson – backing vocals and piano on "Girl Sailor"
Anita Robinson – backing vocals on "Phantom Limb" and "Turn On Me"
Paloma Griffin – violin on "Red Rabbits"
Niels Gallaway – French horn on "A Comet Appears"
Additional assistance by Jason McGerr, Marisa Kula, Chris Jones, Bob Stark, Brian Lowe, Brian Vibberts, Kendra Lynn, Wes Johnson & Pete Tewes.

Production
Produced by James Mercer and Joe Chiccarelli
Mixed by Joe Chiccarelli
Additional production on "Australia", "Girl Sailor" and "Phantom Limb" by Phil Ek
Recorded by Sean Flora, Hiro Ninagawa, Brian Deck and Lars Fox
Recorded at Supernatural Sound, Oregon City; The Aural Apothecary, Portland; Avast! 2, Seattle
Mastered by Emily Lazar and Sarah Register at The Lodge, New York City
Design and illustration by Robert Mercer

Charts

References

External links
The Shins Hit the Fans, Sub Pop Calls in the Sheriff - Idolator
 theshins.co.uk, The Shins UK fansite

The Shins albums
2007 albums
Sub Pop albums
Albums produced by Joe Chiccarelli